The Long Falling is a 2011 French-Belgian drama film written and directed by Martin Provost.

Plot
Long victim of her husband, violent and alcoholic, Rose Mayer, the Walloon countryside, decided to take their destiny in hand, and kills by crushing it with their car after leaving prison for having crushed a girl with the same car. She joined her son, homosexual, in Brussels, who left the family hell the day of his 16th birthday. But freedom does not erase guilt and family stories are not without contradictions. Rose does find its place in his new life?

Cast
 Yolande Moreau as Rose Mayer
 Pierre Moure as Thomas Mayer
 Édith Scob as Madame Talbot
 Jan Hammenecker as Inspector Nols
 Laurent Capelluto as Denis
 Eric Godon as Debacker
 Loïc Pichon as The husband
 Servane Ducorps as Marina
 Valentijn Dhaenens as Vincent

Accolades

References

External links
 

2011 films
2011 drama films
French drama films
Belgian drama films
2010s French-language films
Films about domestic violence
Films based on Irish novels
Films directed by Martin Provost
French-language Belgian films
2010s French films